In hurling, the term "Big Three" refers to the hurling county teams of Cork, Kilkenny and Tipperary.

Historically, these three counties have dominated the sport. Together, they have won 94 out of 134 of the All-Ireland Senior Hurling Championships (70%) and 52/91 (57%) of the National Hurling Leagues.

Results
Accurate to 1 August 2022.

See also
Cork–Kilkenny hurling rivalry
Cork–Tipperary hurling rivalry
Kilkenny–Tipperary hurling rivalry

References